Saint Misbehavin': The Wavy Gravy Movie is a 2009 documentary about hippie icon and entertainer Wavy Gravy.

References

External links 

2009 films
American documentary films
Documentary films about entertainers
Hippie films
2000s English-language films
2000s American films